Empower Field at Mile High (previously known as Broncos Stadium at Mile High, Invesco Field at Mile High and Sports Authority Field at Mile High, and commonly known as Mile High, New Mile High or Mile High Stadium) is an American football stadium in Denver, Colorado, United States. The primary tenant is the Denver Broncos of the National Football League (NFL). It opened in 2001 to replace the Broncos' original home, the old Mile High Stadium. The venue was previously home of the Denver Outlaws lacrosse team and the Colorado Rapids soccer team. It has also played host to countless concerts and served as the venue for Barack Obama's acceptance of the Democratic presidential nomination, at the 2008 Democratic National Convention.

Given the difficulty of competing at altitude, as well as the notoriously loud fans, the Broncos are known to have one of the best home field advantages in the NFL.

On March 24, 2022, a fire broke out that damaged some suites and many seats on the third level. The fire was caused by sparks from a welding torch.

Financing

Legislative effort 
The Broncos' pursuit of the new stadium included a lobbying effort that included 13 lawyers and tens of thousands of dollars. This effort was directed at the passing of SB 171 which put Referendum 4A on the November 1998 ballot. SB 171 was sponsored by Representative Doug Dean (R) from Colorado Springs. Members of the state legislature claimed that this was one of the largest lobbying efforts they had seen.

In November 1998, Denver voters passed referendum 4A which was in favor of the construction of a new football stadium to replace the existing Mile High Stadium. The referendum was included on the ballots of six Colorado counties that comprise the Denver Metropolitan area. The referendum called for the extension of a tenth of a percent sales tax on transactions within the Metro area to go towards the cost of issuing a $224.9 million bond. This tax was originally established in 1990 when the Colorado Rockies sought public financing for Coors Field. Financing and construction for the stadium was monitored by the Metropolitan Football Stadium District (MFSD). The MFSD is a subdivision of the State of Colorado that, “was created for the purpose of planning, acquiring land and constructing a professional football stadium”. The MFSD is also responsible for implementing the MFSD tax. The extension of the original stadium tax came into effect on January 1, 2001.

The funding deal between the Broncos and the State of Colorado called for the team to pay 25% of the estimated cost of $400 million while the state would pay the other 75% of the cost. Part of the agreement stipulated that the MFSD would collect half of the 10 year, $120 million naming rights deal with Invesco Funds Group. Upon Sports Authority’s bankruptcy, the Broncos agreed to pay the MFSD $3.6 million to assume ownership of the naming rights of the stadium.

Corporate partners

Naming rights 

Invesco paid $120 million for the original naming rights in 2001, before Sports Authority secured them in August 2011.

Despite its sponsor's liquidation and closure in 2016, the Sports Authority name remained on the stadium for two years afterwards because of regulatory hurdles. Nevertheless, the Broncos announced on January 2, 2018 that the stadium's exterior signage would be removed. The stadium took on a temporary name, Broncos Stadium at Mile High, for the remainder of 2018 - including the 2018 NFL season - and part of 2019 before a new corporate naming rights agreement with Colorado-based Empower Retirement was announced on September 4, 2019.

Concessions 
Concessions are currently run by Aramark Corporation. Aramark took over concession at the beginning of the 2019 season as Empower Retirement assumed the naming rights. As part of their offerings, Aramark has partnered with several Denver restaurants to provide a more robust selection of food options. The new partners include Frank Bonanno, a Denver restaurateur known for his many popular restaurants around downtown Denver.

Improvements 
On December 21, 2012, the Broncos announced a $30 million renovation project prior to the start of the 2013 season, including a new HD LED video board on the stadium's south end zone that tripled the size of the video board used in the early 2000s.

In 2013, it was revealed that a Neil Smith Kansas City Chiefs jersey was buried somewhere near the 50-yard line by a couple of out-of-state contractors during renovations, despite Smith's play on the Broncos' Super Bowl XXXII and XXXIII-winning teams. The curse the contractors hoped to create did not occur as the Broncos won another Super Bowl two years later, Super Bowl 50.

In an effort to be selected as a host city for the 2026 FIFA World Cup, the MFSD invested $8.3 million on stadium improvements to satisfy FIFA's requirements. Included in the improvements are the addition of LED lights as well as locker room and seating upgrades.

Ongoing improvements include replacing the seats in third and suite levels that were burned out in March 2022, which will be ready by the Broncos' upcoming preseason in August.

Controversies

Naming rights 
During construction of the new stadium, Denver mayor, Wellington Webb opposed the sale of the stadium's naming rights. At this time, the potential partners were AT&T, Janus Capital, and Invesco Funds Group. A group called Friends of Mile High created a poll asking whether fans preferred the old name or would be fine with a corporate sponsor. The poll found that 70% of respondents preferred to keep the name as Mile High despite a potential loss of $89 million in revenue for the state.

Many fans opposed a corporate name and wished to retain the previous venue's name, "Mile High Stadium." The Denver Post initially refused to use the Invesco label and referred to it as Mile High Stadium for several years before changing its policy and adding Invesco to articles.

On August 16, 2011, the Metropolitan Stadium District announced Invesco would immediately transfer the naming rights to Englewood-based Sports Authority in a 25-year agreement worth $6 million per year. In August 2016, the Denver Broncos paid $3,601,890 to the Metropolitan Football Stadium District to purchase the naming rights to the stadium. As the naming rights change began to occur, the MFSD sought permission to install larger signs on the newly named stadium. Residents of the neighborhood sought to block the installation of new signs in an effort to keep light pollution down. Neighborhood complaints included concerns about light pollution as well as the aesthetic value of the Sports Authority sign that the MFSD hoped to install on the stadium.

In 2016, several Colorado legislators attempted to pass a bill in the Colorado State Legislature that would require the "Mile High" moniker regardless of any naming rights deal, citing the large public contribution to the stadium's construction; the bill failed to pass out of a Senate Committee in May 2016.

Many citizens of the surrounding neighborhoods have expressed discontent with the impact of the stadium on their environment. Residents have complained about the increased traffic on game days, frequent public urination by intoxicated fans.

Financing 
A 2016 study by the Brookings Institution has found that the federal government lost out on significant tax revenue in their deal with the Broncos to pay for the stadium. The study of 36 professional football stadiums found that the tax exempt municipal bonds caused $49 million in lost tax revenue for the federal government. Additionally, the income tax break that bond holders could claim cost the government an additional $5 million.

Usage
The stadium is used primarily for American football games. It is the home field for Denver's National Football League team, the Denver Broncos. The stadium previously hosted one of the city's Major League Lacrosse teams, the Denver Outlaws. In college football, it has hosted the rivalry game between the Colorado State University Rams and the University of Colorado Boulder Buffaloes. It is also used for the CHSAA class 4A and 5A Colorado high school football state championship games, and has been used for the CBA Marching Band Finals.

In addition, it has been used for a Drum Corps International (DCI) Championship in 2004 and the annual Drums Along the Rockies competition. It is also used for concerts, music festivals and other events, and was home to the city's Major League Soccer franchise, the Colorado Rapids, before that team built and moved into Dick's Sporting Goods Park in suburban Commerce City.

On June 23, 2018, England played New Zealand in a rugby league match at the stadium. England won the match 36-18.

Location
The construction of the stadium marked the completion of a six-year sporting venue upgrade program in Denver, including the construction of Coors Field and of Pepsi Center. As with the other venues, the stadium was constructed to be easily accessible. It sits along Interstate 25 near the Colfax Avenue and 17th Avenue exits. It is also bordered by Federal Boulevard, a major Denver thoroughfare, on the west side. A dedicated light rail station also serves the stadium. The stadium is located in the Sun Valley neighborhood.

Stadium culture and traditions

A home game tradition (carried over from the original Mile High Stadium) is the "Incomplete Chant." At Broncos home games, when the opposing team throws an incomplete pass, the stadium announcer will state "Pass thrown by [the opposing quarterback] intended for [the opposing intended receiver] is..." at which time the fans complete the sentence by shouting "IN-COM-PLETE!!". In a tradition carried over from Mile High Stadium, the stadium's public-address announcer will give the final official attendance for the game, including the number of unused tickets; in response, Broncos fans "boo" the no-shows. During the stadium's first years, in another tradition that was carried over from Mile High, Broncos fans on one side of the stadium would chant "Go" and fans on the other side would respond "Broncos," back and forth chanting for several minutes. That tradition has since died out. Another long-term tradition is famed rowdiness of fans seated in the "South Stands,"  although this tradition has diminished significantly as well. Finally, especially in the upper two decks, the fans create their own 'Mile High Thunder' (and warm themselves) by stamping their feet on the stadium's floors. The old Mile High Stadium was built with bare metal, and the 'Thunder' reverberated readily. The new stadium was built with steel floors to preserve this unique acoustic feature.

Notable events

NFL events

On September 10, 2001, the stadium hosted its first regular season NFL game, in which the Broncos defeated the New York Giants 31–20. In a pre-game ceremony, Broncos legends John Elway, Steve Atwater, Randy Gradishar, Haven Moses, Billy Thompson, Floyd Little, Dennis Smith, and Karl Mecklenburg helped to "Move the Thunder" from the old Mile High Stadium to the new home of the Broncos.

The stadium has hosted several NFL playoff games. It hosted the 2005 AFC Divisional playoff game, in which Denver defeated the New England Patriots 27–13. The following week, it hosted the AFC Championship Game, which the Broncos lost to the Pittsburgh Steelers, 34–17. On January 8, 2012, the stadium hosted its third NFL playoff game, an AFC Wild Card playoff game against the Steelers. The Broncos won in overtime, 29–23. On January 12, 2013, the stadium hosted its fourth NFL playoff game, an AFC Divisional playoff game against the Baltimore Ravens. The Broncos lost to the Ravens 38–35 in double overtime.

On October 29, 2007, a record crowd of 77,160 watched the Broncos lose to the Green Bay Packers 19–13 on Monday Night Football on the first play from scrimmage in overtime.

On November 26, 2009, it hosted its first Thanksgiving game, when the Broncos took on the Giants. The game was televised on NFL Network, which the Broncos won by a final score of 26–6.

On January 19, 2014, the Broncos defeated the Patriots in the AFC Championship Game, 26–16 in front of 77,110 fans in attendance, advancing to their first Super Bowl since they began play in the new stadium.

On January 17, 2016, the Broncos defeated the Steelers in the AFC Divisional playoffs, 23–16 in front of 77,100, advancing to the AFC Championship Game for the 10th time in franchise history.

On January 24, 2016, the Broncos defeated the Patriots in the AFC Championship Game, 20–18 in front of 77,100, advancing to Super Bowl 50, which they won two weeks later.

Soccer
On July 26, 2014, Sports Authority Field at Mile High hosted a soccer match between Manchester United and A.S. Roma which was part of the 2014 International Champions Cup and Manchester United won the match 3-2.

Rugby league
The stadium hosted an international rugby league match between New Zealand and England on June 23, 2018.

Concerts
The stadium has held several concerts.

Other notable events

The stadium has hosted other sports events. The first football game held (college, on September 1, 2001; attendance 75,022) was the Rocky Mountain Showdown, when the University of Colorado Buffaloes defeated the Colorado State University Rams 41–14. On July 2, 2005, it hosted the 2005 Major League Lacrosse All-Star Game. In 2006, Major League Lacrosse placed the expansion Outlaws in Denver.

In August 1977, 1978 and 2004, it hosted the Drum Corps International (DCI) World Championships, and every July hosts Drums Along the Rockies, which is a major competition in the annual DCI summer tour. Drums Along the Rockies is the longest-running event held at any Mile High named stadium, from 1963 through 2019.  Although canceled in 2020 due to the COVID Pandemic, the event is expected to return in July 2021.

On August 28, 2008, Democratic presidential nominee Barack Obama accepted the Democratic Party's nomination for President of the United States here, moving the 2008 Democratic National Convention from Ball Arena. Approximately 84,000 people attended Obama's speech, exceeding the normal capacity of the stadium due to the placement of audience on the field.

On April 13, 2019, the stadium hosted its first AMA Supercross Championship event.

On April 27, 2019, the stadium hosted its first Monster Jam show. On April 23, 2022, it hosted another.

The stadium was a candidate venue for the 2026 FIFA World Cup, however it was not chosen by FIFA as one of the 16 venues to host to the tournament.

Denver Broncos Ring of Fame
The Denver Broncos Ring of Fame was created in 1984 by team owner Pat Bowlen to honor former players and administrators who played significant roles in the franchise's history. The names and years of service (and in most cases, jersey numbers) of the men inducted into the ring are displayed on the Level 5 facade of the stadium.  There is no specific number of new members that may be chosen for induction in any given year; in many years, no new members were inducted.

While the Ring of Fame was carried over from the old stadium to the new, the names were re-ordered to separate the inductees who served the team during the pre-Pat Bowlen (the team's current owner and founder of the Ring) era from those who served during Bowlen's ownership. One of the most noticeable changes was the move of John Elway's name to the center of the ring, located directly between the goalposts of the north end zone.

Colorado Sports Hall of Fame Museum
The Colorado Sports Hall of Fame Museum opened in August 2001. It is located at Gate #1 on the west side of the stadium.

2022 fire
A fire broke out on March 24, 2022, destroying several sections of third row seats and fourth-level suites, though no injuries were reported. The fire caused damage to approximately "1000 feet of seating." The cause of the fire was determined to be from a welding torch being used on an expansion joint. The fire also forced Empower Field at Mile High staff to reorganize events scheduled to take place at the stadium. The damage was said to be a "real challenge" to repair in time for the next Denver Broncos regular season, due to damage to steel risers and difficulties in procuring replacement materials.

See also
Mile High Stadium
Coors Field
Ball Arena
Dick's Sporting Goods Park
McNichols Arena
National Sports Center for the Disabled

References

External links

Sports Authority Field at Mile High at StadiumDB.com
Sports Authority Field at Mile High Seating Chart

National Football League venues
College football venues
Lacrosse venues in the United States
Major League Lacrosse venues
American football venues in Colorado
Sports venues in Denver
Denver Broncos stadiums
Colorado Rapids stadiums
Former Major League Soccer stadiums
Rugby league stadiums in the United States
Sports venues completed in 2001
2001 establishments in Colorado
CONCACAF Gold Cup stadiums